The Borough of Dartford is a local government district in the north-west of the county of Kent, England. Its council is based in the town of Dartford. It is part of the contiguous London urban area. It borders the borough of Gravesham to the east, Sevenoaks District to the south, the London Borough of Bexley to the west, and the Thurrock unitary authority in Essex to the north, across the River Thames. The borough was formed on 1 April 1974 by the merger of the Municipal Borough of Dartford, the Swanscombe Urban District, and part of the Dartford Rural District. According to the 2011 Census, its population was 97,365.

Government

Since 2010, the Dartford constituency's Member of Parliament (MP) is Gareth Johnson (Conservative) who replaced the outgoing Howard Stoate (Labour).

The leader of the council, from February 2006, is Councillor Jeremy Kite (Conservative). Councillors represent the following seventeen wards as of 2018:
 Bean and Village Park
 Brent
Bridge
Burnham
Darenth
Ebbsfleet
 Greenhithe and Knockhall
 Heath
 Joydens Wood
 Longfield, New Barn and Southfleet
 Maypole and Leyton Cross
Newtown
 Princes
 Stone Castle
Stone House
 Swanscombe
 Temple Hill
Town
 West Hill
 Wilmington, Sutton-at-Hone and Hawley
NB the boundaries of these wards do not necessarily coincide with the parish boundaries.

Political control

As of May 2019, the council is made up as follows:

The following civil parishes are also included in the borough:
Bean
Darenth
Longfield and New Barn
Southfleet
Stone
Sutton-at-Hone and Hawley
Swanscombe and Greenhithe
Wilmington

In addition to the settlements named above, there is the urban village of Joydens Wood to the south-west of the town.

Dartford Youth Council 

Dartford also has a youth council called the Dartford Youth Council (DYC) which comprises members of the youth representing local secondary schools, youth groups (such as Scouts). They discuss important issues relating to the youth of Dartford, such as mental health, to staying fit and how they can help and combat those issues. They attend a monthly meeting, at the Dartford Civic Centre. They have represented Dartford's youth in several events. Every November, members attend and represent Dartford Youth Council in the annual Dartford Remembrance Parade.

Communications in the borough

Railways

There are seven railway stations in the borough: at Stone; Greenhithe (for Bluewater); Swanscombe and Dartford, all on the North Kent Line; and Longfield and Farningham Road on the Victoria – Chatham Main Line. From Dartford there are three lines serving London and one to Gravesend, the Medway Towns and eastern Kent. For many services Dartford is the terminus.

Ebbsfleet International railway station on High Speed 1 opened in the east of the borough on 19 November 2007.  Six high-speed services to Paris and five to Brussels run daily from here by Eurostar. The station also carries commuters to St Pancras station in London in only 17 minutes, and to Stratford International (next to the 2012 Summer Olympics site) in just 10 minutes, while eastbound commuter services link Ebbsfleet to Ashford International, Dover, Folkestone and other stations in Kent.

Notable bus service
The first of the Fastrack bus services, using a combination of ordinary roads and dedicated 'bus tracks' commenced in March 2006. The service runs from the Temple Hill area of Dartford, through the town centre and on to Bluewater Shopping Centre, Greenhithe, Ebbsfleet International and Gravesend.

Roads

Three of the county's main roads pass through the borough boundaries: the M25 and M20 motorways and the A2 dual carriageway. The A20, A225 and the A226 roads also cross the borough, among others.

Dartford gives its name to the Dartford Crossing of the River Thames, a pair of road tunnels (constructed in 1963 and 1980), with the Queen Elizabeth II Bridge (October 1991), dual-linking Kent with Essex and connecting sections of the London Orbital M25 motorway.

Housing and architecture

The layout of the district is clustered development in the northern half and buffered, dispersed settlement interspersed by the North Downs which is an escarpment of varied farms and woodland in the south.
The M25 motorway bisects the district
Swanscombe and Greenhithe have low rise homes and mid rise by the river Thames.

Housing is a mixture of relatively high rise in Dartford centre through to low rise in all of the villages.

The number of listed buildings in the district exceeds 50.  This includes 7 churches listed in the highest grading in the national listing system (Grade I).

Demography

2011 census
The population rose in the 10 years to 2011 from 85,911 to 97,365, by 13.3%, which was above the national average.

87.3% of residents were born in England, which was 2.5% higher than the average for the South East.  The next most common group of countries of birth was the non-EU, however this was 0.3% lower than the average for the South-East and 2% lower than the average for England.

As to residents of EU birth, only 3.3% of the population were such, slightly below the national average and two-thirds of this migration was from the accession countries from 2001 to 2011, a 12.5% higher proportion than that seen nationwide.

As to older people, the borough has a below national and regional proportion.  In common with most of the country, an increase in people living in their area above the age of 74 took place, whether through change in preference or most commonly longevity, from 6.5% in 2001 to 7.1% in 2011.

With 80.8% of households with a car or van, this was 6.6% above the national average, however still marginally lower than South East's record and national-high of 81.4%.

1.0% of the population lived in a communal establishment in the area.

As to homes, as 12.6% of properties in the area are detached, these form a smaller minority than the regional and national averages (at	28.0% and 22.3% of dwellings respectively).

Its people in 2011 were more economically active than the regional and national average; while self-employed inhabitants were at parity with the national average, those in full-time employment were 6.0% greater.

As to religion, statistics mirrored closely the national average, save that more Hindus and Sikhs live in the borough, at a combined, equally split 3.2% of the total population and fewer Muslims, also forming 1.6% of the population.  Being almost at the mean for the country, Christians form just over 60% of the area's population.

Employment

Although many of area's traditional industries of papermaking, cement, and pharmaceuticals are in decline or closing down, and many of borough's inhabitants travel away from the borough by rail and road (many commuting to London and other areas for work), there is still a large industrial and commercial base. Included among those areas include 'The Bridge' and Crossways to either side of the Queen Elizabeth II Bridge, areas around Greenhithe and a  site planned to contain five separate 'villages' in the Eastern Quarry near Bluewater Shopping Centre, itself a large employer.

In October 2012 Dartford and Gravesham councils co-announced plans for a major theme park to be built on the Swanscombe peninsula, which would create up to 27,000 jobs by 2018.

See also
Grade I listed buildings in Dartford (borough)
Grade II* listed buildings in Dartford (borough)

References

External links
The borough website
The Mayor of Dartford's website
Visit Swanscombe Town Guide

 
Local authorities adjoining the River Thames
Non-metropolitan districts of Kent
Boroughs in England